Patricio Jerez may refer to:
 Patricio Jerez (footballer, born 1985)
 Patricio Jerez (footballer, born 1987)